The Church of Rock and Roll is the fourth studio album by Foxy Shazam. The first single was released on to their Facebook page on October 6, 2011, as a free download.

On December 5, 2011, the track listing, date and cover art for the album was posted.
On December 23, 2011, the song "Welcome to the Church of Rock and Roll" was given as a free download to anyone who pre-ordered the album. Rolling Stone began to stream the entire album on their website on 20 January, a few days before the official release date.

Reception 
Reviews were mainly positive for the album, with Judah Joseph of the Huffington Post describing the album as "music that sounds better being blared from an old Chevy than out of MacBook speakers."  Nicholas Moffitt's review for VZ Magazine says The Church of Rock and Roll is "A spectacle and a rumpus and a purely good time."

Track listing
All songs written and composed by Foxy Shazam.

B-sides
 "I'll Be Home Soon Mother Earth" - (only on a limited tour edition 7" vinyl single of I Like It)

Charts

Personnel
Foxy Shazam
Eric Nally - Vocals
Sky White - Keyboards
Daisy Caplan - Bass
Loren Turner - Guitar
Alex Nauth - Horns
Aaron McVeigh - Drums

References

2012 albums
I.R.S. Records albums
Foxy Shazam albums